Anamirta is a genus of woody vines, native to southern Asia.

Species
Anamirta cocculus
Anamirta jucunda Miers (Java)
Anamirta lemniscata Miers (Java)
Anamirta lourieri Pierre (Cambodia)
Anamirta luctuosa Miers (Java)
Anamirta paniculata (East Asia)
Anamirta populifera Miers (Timor)
Anamirta pfeiffer (Status : fossil)

References

Menispermaceae genera
Menispermaceae